Sergei Fedorovich Babkov (December 28, 1920, Zlatoust, Soviet Russia; October 6, 1993, Saint Petersburg, Russia) was a Soviet Russian painter, a member of the Saint Petersburg Union of Artists (before 1992 — the Leningrad Union of Artists), who lived and worked in Leningrad, regarded as a representative of the Leningrad school of painting, most famous for his genre and portrait paintings.

See also
 Leningrad School of Painting
 List of 20th-century Russian painters
 List of painters of Saint Petersburg Union of Artists
 Saint Petersburg Union of Artists

References

Sources 
 1917 — 1957. Выставка произведений ленинградских художников. Каталог. Л., Ленинградский художник, 1958. С.8.
 Никифоровская И. Итоги большой творческой работы // Вечерний Ленинград. 1957, 10 октября.
 Выставка произведений ленинградских художников 1961 года. Каталог. Л., Художник РСФСР, 1964. С.9.
 Ленинград. Зональная выставка. Л., Художник РСФСР, 1965. С.9.
 Каталог весенней выставки произведений ленинградских художников 1965 года. Л., Художник РСФСР, 1970. С.8.
 Выставка произведений ленинградских художников, посвящённая 25-летию Победы над фашистской Германией. Каталог. Л., Художник РСФСР, 1972. С.17.
 Художники народов СССР. Биобиблиографический словарь. Т.1. М., Искусство, 1970. С.249-250.
 Наш современник. Зональная выставка произведений ленинградских художников 1975 года. Каталог. Л., Художник РСФСР, 1980. С.11.
 Справочник членов Союза художников СССР. Т. 1 М., Советский художник, 1979. С.78.
 Справочник членов Ленинградской организации Союза художников РСФСР. Л., Художник РСФСР, 1987. С.9.
 Peinture Russe. Catalogue. Paris, Drouot Richelieu, 24 Septembre 1991. Р.15-17.
 Выставка произведений художников — ветеранов Великой Отечественной войны. СПб, 1998.
 Matthew Cullerne Bown. A Dictionary of Twentieth Century Russian And Soviet Painters. 1900 — 1980s. London, Izomar Limited, 1998.
 Мы помним… Художники, искусствоведы — участники Великой Отечественной войны. М., Союз художников России, 2000. С.33.
 Художники — городу. Выставка к 70-летию Санкт-Петербургского Союза художников. Каталог. — Санкт-Петербург: Петрополь, 2003. — с.178.
 Sergei V. Ivanov. Unknown Socialist Realism. The Leningrad School. Saint Petersburg, NP-Print Edition, 2007. P.392, 398. , .
 Юбилейный Справочник выпускников Санкт-Петербургского академического института живописи, скульптуры и архитектуры имени И. Е. Репина Российской Академии художеств. 1915—2005. СПб., «Первоцвет», 2007. С.73.

1920 births
1993 deaths
People from Zlatoust
20th-century Russian painters
Russian male painters
Soviet painters
Socialist realist artists
Russian portrait painters
Leningrad School artists
Members of the Leningrad Union of Artists
Repin Institute of Arts alumni
Soviet military personnel of World War II
20th-century Russian male artists